Yosepha Alomang (Mama Yosepha) is from the Indonesian province of Papua, one of the most biologically diverse places on the planet.

She was awarded the Goldman Environmental Prize in 2001, for her efforts on organizing her community to resist the mining company Freeport-McMoRan's mining practices over three decades that have destroyed rainforests, polluted rivers, and displaced communities.

References

Indonesian environmentalists
Living people
People from Mimika Regency
Year of birth missing (living people)
Goldman Environmental Prize awardees